Dyke is an unincorporated community in Greene County, Virginia, United States. It is located along Virginia Secondary State Route 810. In 2020, the small store in Dyke was replaced with a new larger store and gas station.

It is located near Saint George, Virginia and The Blue Ridge School.

Estes Farm was listed the National Register of Historic Places in 2006.

References

GNIS reference

Unincorporated communities in Greene County, Virginia
Unincorporated communities in Virginia